The Société financière française et coloniale (SFFC, "French and Colonial Financial Company") was a French investment bank that was an active investor in colonial ventures, particularly in the 1920s. It was founded in 1920 by financier Octave Homberg, who led it until having to leave in stages in 1930-1931 following heavy losses. In 1949, the SFFC changed its name to Société financière pour la France et les pays d'Outre-Mer (SOFFO, "Financial Company for France and Overseas Lands"), which eventually merged into investment company Suez Industrie in 1998.

History

The new company was designed to channel investments in colonial ventures, primarily though not exclusively in French Indochina, which the Banque de l'Indochine was too cautious to undertake on its own. It was strongly supported by Lazard until a dispute in 1926. The company was initially domiciled at 35, boulevard Haussmann in Paris, and was later registered at the Banque de l'Indochine's head office at 96 bis, boulevard Haussmann. In 1927 it moved into a purpose-built head office of its own. Throughout the 1920s, it raised its capital on repeated occasions and invested in numerous companies, both in Metropolitan France and in Indochina, as well as in the New Hebrides, Djibouti, and Gabon.

The SFFC's fortunes were negatively impacted by the economic downturn in 1929 and especially by turmoil in the rubber market, which led to a severe decline in the SFFC's stock price in late 1930, an incipient bank run, and eventually a comprehensive though protracted restructuring. In December 1930, the French government sponsored a financial package of 105 million francs, with credit provided by the Banque de l'Indochine (35 million), Lazard (20 million), the Banque de l'Union Parisienne (20 million), and Worms & Cie (5 million) together with the government itself (25 million), with an additional credit package provided by the same four banks in June 1931. Octave Homberg resigned his SFFC-related mandates in December 1930 and January 1931, and was replaced by Camille Barrère as SFFC chairman. The government of French Indochina contributed further financial support in June 1932. Eventually, in May 1933, the Banque de l'Indochine provided fresh equity and wrote off some of its prior lending to the SFFC. By mid-1935, the SFFC, which was no longer a bank but only an investment holding company, had sold many of its former assets and was again on a sound footing.  succeeded Barrère as SFFC chairman in 1935.

During World War II, the SFFC relocated its head office to Vichy from June 1940 to November 1944, when it moved back to Paris. By 1967, more than half of the SOFFO's revenue came from Metropolitan France.

In 1972, the Suez Company acquired a controlling stake in the SOFFO, which was still publicly traded. Edmond Giscard d'Estaing left its chairmanship in May 1974, succeeded by Jacques Polton until 1993, then by Patrick Ponsolle. By 1994, Suez held a 29 percent stake in SOFFO. In 1998, SOFFO merged with Suez Industrie, another holding entity within the Suez group.

Buildings

Paris

The first building at 51, rue d'Anjou, designed by architect Paul Fabre and completed in 1927, combines post-Haussmannian architectural codes with decorative details inspired by Southeast Asian art and especially Khmer sculpture, such as a seven-headed Nāga, Buddha's heads, and Khmer-style demons supporting balconies. In 1996, the  relocated to Montpellier. The building became the seat of the Institut national de l'origine et de la qualité, a public intellectual-property agency, and more recently of Maurel & Prom, an oil exploration services company.

The second SFFC building at 34, rue Pasquier, was completed in 1929 on a design by architect Alex Fournier and his son Pierre in art deco style, and includes monumental bas-relief sculptures by Georges Saupique. It was sold by the SFFC, at a loss, as soon as 1933. After having hosted the Lonsdale clothing brand in the 2010s, it has been the head office of luxury brand Lancel since February 2022.

Ironically, the SFFC was a prominent exponent at the Paris Colonial Exposition in 1931, just at the time of its near-bankruptcy and financial restructuring, with a pavilion designed by architect Albert James Furiet with sculpture by Georges Saupique. The pavilion was demolished after the end of the exhibition. 

By early 1940, the SFFC's head office was at 23, rue Nitot in Paris. The street was renamed  in 1949, following lobbying by Edmond Giscard d'Estaing.

Saigon

Following the Fall of Saigon, the building was used until 2015 by the Mekong Housing Bank, and more recently by the Bank for Investment and Development of Vietnam (BIDV).

Other locations

The SFFC sold it to one of its creditors in 1936. The building still exists and is used as a branch by Vietinbank. 

The SFFC inaugurated a branch building in Hanoi in 1928, but closed it after only a few years of operation.

By the early 1930s the SFFC also had offices in Phnom Penh and Casablanca.

See also
 Banque de l'Indochine

Notes

Defunct banks of France
French colonisation in Asia
French Indochina